Cotehele is a medieval house with Tudor additions, situated in the parish of Calstock in the east of Cornwall, England, and now belonging to the National Trust. It is a rambling granite and slate-stone manor house on the banks of the River Tamar that has been little changed over five centuries. It was built by the Edgecumbe family in 1458 after the original Manor House was pulled down. Sir Richard Edgecumbe came into the property after fighting for Henry Tudor in the Battle of Bosworth. He was gifted with money and the original Manor House and estate and then proceeded to build Cotehele.

History
Probably originating circa 1300, the main phases of building appear to have been started by Sir Richard Edgcumbe from 1485–89 and followed by his son, Sir Piers Edgcumbe, from 1489–1520. This house is one of the least altered of the Tudor houses in the United Kingdom. The outbuildings include a stone dovecote in a remarkable state of preservation. For centuries a second home of the Edgcumbe family, it was the first property to be accepted by the Treasury in payment of death duty. The house and estate are now under the care of the National Trust.  Notable contents include the Cotehele cupboard and the Cotehele clock. The house contains many tapestries that came, along with much of the furniture, from Mount Edgcumbe House. Regrettably, some have had pieces cut out to fit them in their new locations.

The site
The house is a Grade I listed building, having been so designated on 21 July 1951. The house was probably founded around 1300 and various alterations were made in the early fifteenth century. Sir Richard Edgcumbe seems to have been involved in the first phase of development from 1486 to 1489, with his son Sir Piers Edgcumbe taking over for the second phase, from 1489 to 1520.

The grounds stretch down to a quay on the River Tamar where there is an outpost of the National Maritime Museum. There are a number of formal gardens and a richly planted area in the valley; features include a medieval dovecote, a stewpond, a Victorian summerhouse and the eighteenth century  Prospect Tower. The gardens and parkland are listed as Grade II* on the Register of Parks and Gardens of Special Historic Interest in England. The south west side of the estate is bordered by the Morden stream which joins the Tamar at the quay. The estate mill is fed by this stream. The mill was used to grind grain bought in Plymouth and brought up river on the barge Myrtle, and also to drive a sawmill and a generator for electricity. The Grade II listed mill has been restored to working order, producing flour for use in the restaurant as well as for sale.

In 2008 a 'Mother Orchard' of over 250 apple trees, mainly of West-country varieties, was planted. The 8 acre orchard site is divided into eating, culinary and cider varieties.

Cotehele's chapels

Cotehele House Chapel
In Cotehele, on the west side of Hall Court are the Vicarage and the Chapel, the chapel is connected to the main building via a small passageway leading to the dining room. The patron saints are St. Katharine and St. Anne. The chapel is among the oldest rooms in the house, alongside the Great Hall. In the chapel, there is a very rare and the original clock, still in operation today, it dates back to the Tudor period.

Cotehele Woodland Chapel
In the grounds of Cotehele, directly East of the House close to the River Tamar, lies a peaceful, basic chapel. inside there are pews going around the walls, two minister's benches and a very ornate table. the patron saints of the chapel are St George and St  Thomas Becket. The Chapel was built by Sir Richard Edgcumbe (died 1489) between 1485 and 1489 as a thanksgiving for his escape from forces loyal to Richard III in 1483.

The Edgcumbe Chapel
The Edgcumbe Chapel is located in the East of the Northern aisle at St. Andrew's Church Calstock, it contains two monuments of the late 17th- century: to Piers Edgcumbe (1666) and to Jemima, Countess of Sandwich (1674). it is no longer a chapel, but used by ministers to store religious items.

Film location
Cotehele was used in the filming of Trevor Nunn's 1996 film adaptation of Twelfth Night. it was used for scenes taking place in the quayside tavern and the inside of Orsino's castle.

Gallery

See also
 Mount Edgcumbe House
 Cotehele clock
 List of topics related to Cornwall

References

External links 

 Cotehele information at the National Trust
 Cotehele Mill information at the National Trust
 

 
Gardens in Cornwall
Grade I listed buildings in Cornwall
Grade I listed houses
Country houses in Cornwall
National Trust properties in Cornwall
Historic house museums in Cornwall
Buildings and structures in Cornwall
Grade II* listed parks and gardens in Cornwall